Raymond Harold Rissmiller (born July 22, 1942) is a former American football offensive tackle in the National Football League for the Philadelphia Eagles and the New Orleans Saints. He also played in the American Football League for the Buffalo Bills. He played college football at Georgia.

References

1942 births
Living people
Easton Area High School alumni
American football offensive tackles
Buffalo Bills players
Georgia Bulldogs football players
New Orleans Saints players
Philadelphia Eagles players
Sportspeople from Easton, Pennsylvania
Players of American football from Pennsylvania
American Football League players